Amy Wrzesniewski is an American organizational psychologist.

She attended the University of Pennsylvania before pursuing graduate study in organizational psychology at the University of Michigan, where she earned her master's and doctoral degree. Prior to joining the Yale University faculty in 2006, Wrzesniewski taught at New York University. At Yale, she started as an associate professor of management, and was appointed to a full professorship in 2015. She was named the Michael H. Jordan Professor of Management in 2018.

References

Living people
Year of birth missing (living people)
American women psychologists
21st-century American psychologists
Organizational psychologists
Yale School of Management faculty
New York University faculty
University of Michigan alumni
University of Pennsylvania alumni
21st-century American women scientists
21st-century social scientists
American women academics